Hiroshi Kajiyama may refer to:

 Hiroshi Kajiyama (politician) (born 1955), Japanese politician of the Liberal Democratic Party
 Hiroshi Kajiyama (gymnast) (born 1953), Japanese former gymnast